Scarlet cleaner shrimp may refer to:
Lysmata amboinensis, also known as the skunk cleaner shrimp
Lysmata debelius, also known as the blood shrimp

Animal common name disambiguation pages